The BMW M42 is a DOHC straight-four petrol engine which was produced from 1989-1996. It is BMW's first mass-production DOHC engine and was produced alongside the BMW M40 SOHC four-cylinder engine as the higher performance engine.

The M42 was replaced by the BMW M44, which was introduced in 1996.

Compared with the M40, the M42 features a DOHC valvetrain, a timing chain, hydraulic valve lifters and an increased 10.0:1 compression ratio. Later versions of the M42 also feature a dual length intake manifold ("DISA").

The M42 was used as the basis for the S42 racing engine, which powered the BMW 320i in the German Super Tourenwagen Cup.

Design 
Following BMW's typical construction techniques at the time, the motor incorporates a cast-iron block and aluminium head. Weight-saving measures include aluminium chain cases, oil sump, motor mount arms, accessory mounts and a cartridge-style oil filter housing. Other features included a forged steel crankshaft and tubular stainless steel exhaust manifold instead of the more typical cast-iron items. BMW also fitted hydraulic motor mounts to decrease the inline four's inherent noise, vibration, and harshness compared to the smoother straight-six engines in production at that time.

When installed in the BMW E30, a two-piece oil pan with a removable front sump was fitted to the M42. In this two-piece arrangement, the upper oil pan casting incorporates the oil pump's supply passage, and is sealed to the crankcase oil filter housing with a paper gasket. This can cause problems, because thermal cycles and engine vibration tend to loosen the upper pan mounting bolts inside the motor.

All versions featured a low-maintenance timing chain with a self-adjusting hydraulic chain tensioner and hydraulic valve tappets. From September 1993, the chain idler gear was replaced by a more reliable curved plastic guide, requiring a new design of front engine/chain casing. The M42 uses the Bosch Motronic M1.7 engine management system, eliminating a distributor in favor of fully electronic ignition timing. The ignition system also uses a coil-on-plug system. In markets that required emissions controls, the DME also incorporates an oxygen sensor and three-way catalytic converter.

From January 1995, the M42 (and all other BMW engines) received the EWS-II engine immobiliser with a revised ECU, a transponder chip in the ignition key, a plastic ring around the ignition lock (introduced with a new steering lock December 1994 in preparation) and an EWS transponder unit behind the glovebox. 

In the final versions of the M42, BMW engineered a dual length intake manifold (called "DISA" by BMW)

Versions

M42B18 

Applications:
 1989–1991 E30 318is
 1990–1992 E30 318i (only North American models)
 1992–1995 E36 318i (only North American and South African models)
 1991–1995 E36 318is
 1994–1995 E36 318ti

S42B20
The racing version of the M42 engine is called the S42 and was used in BMW's 320 4-door touring car, participating in the German Super Tourenwagen Cup. The valve cover and airbox were made from carbon fiber and the lubrication system used a dry sump.

In 1994, the initial version of the S42B20 engine produced .

Timing system revisions 
The earliest versions of the M42 developed problems with the camshaft chain drive. The hydraulic tensioner, chain guides, idler wheel and rear lower chain case were updated to resolve wear problems experienced in the early versions of the M42. The updated cam chain tensioner is shared with that of the later M44 engine.

In September 1993, BMW redesigned the M42's timing chain guide rails, replacing the occasionally troublesome lower idler gear with a curved nylon guide rail. The idler gear's retaining bolt could break away from the timing case, often taking a chunk of alloy timing case with it.

Recalls 
Early models of the M42 experienced failures of a profile gasket sealing the lower cam chain case to the underside of the cylinder head. This gasket seals the primary coolant passage within the timing chain case. A significant failure would thus discharge pressurized steam and hot coolant into the timing chain case. In many cases this coolant rapidly contaminates the motor oil in the sump, causing main bearing failure. BMW updated the profile gasket material and instituted a program to repair motors under warranty. In extreme cases, the aluminum mating surfaces in the head and chain case would corrode.

See also 
 BMW
 List of BMW engines

References

M42
Straight-four engines
Gasoline engines by model